The Lady and the Hooligan is a 1918 Russian silent film co-directed by Vladimir Mayakovsky and Yevgeni Slavinsky. The script, written by Mayakovsky, is based on the play La maestrina degli operai (The Workers' Young Schoolmistress) by Edmondo De Amicis.

Plot summary
A young schoolmistress arrives in a small village to teach reading and writing to boys and men. A hooligan sees her on the street and falls in love with her. Soon he begins to attend her classes. When one lesson is disturbed by one of the students, he beats him. The student seeks revenge with the help of his father and some of his friends. The hooligan is stabbed to death in a fight. Before dying, he asks his mother to call the schoolmistress. After the schoolmistress has kissed him on the lips, he closes his eyes and dies.

Cast 
 Vladimir Mayakovsky—Lava, the hooligan
 Aleksandra Rebikova—the schoolmistress
 Fyodor Dunaev—the director of the school
 Yan Nevinskiy—the hooligan's classmate

Distribution 
On 1 May (May Day), 1919, the film was shown in mass viewings in Moscow and Leningrad.

Analysis and Significance 
The film includes "fast-paced editing and (limited) shot-reverse-shot editing patterns."

References

External links

Lady and the Hooligan available on YouTube: https://www.youtube.com/watch?v=An852TsSmV0

1918 films
Russian silent films
Russian black-and-white films
Films based on works by Edmondo De Amicis
Films of the Russian Empire
Articles containing video clips
Russian films based on plays